A  or gett (plural  ) is a document in Jewish religious law which effectuates a divorce between a Jewish couple. The requirements for a get include that the document be presented by a husband to his wife. The effect of the get is to free the woman from the marriage, and consequently she is free to marry another and that the laws of adultery no longer apply. The  also returns to the wife the legal rights that a husband held in regard to her.

Etymology

The word  may have its origins in the Sumerian word for document, . In fact in the Mishnah,  can refer to any legal document although it refers primarily to a divorce document. (Tosefet Beracha to Ki Tisa)

A number of popular etymological speculations were offered by early modern Rabbinic authorities. According to Shiltei Giborim, it refers to the stone agate, which purportedly has some form of anti-magnetic property symbolizing the divorce. The Gaon of Vilna posits that the Hebrew letters of Gimel and Tet of the word  are the only letters of the Hebrew alphabet that cannot make a word together, again symbolizing the divorce. Baruch Epstein states that it comes from the Latin word gestus "action, gesture", which refers to any legal document. Marcus Jastrow posits a Semitic root, arguing that it derives from the Hebrew word for engraving.

Yechiel Yaakov Weinberg posits that after the Bar Kokhba revolt the Romans decreed that all documents be processed in a Roman court (in order to weaken Jewish nationalism, although it is far more likely that Roman lawmakers were simply following procedure common to all bureaucrats, everywhere, to standardize and simplify their work). The term get may have entered the vernacular language during this time.

Requirements 

 A divorce document must be written; this is usually done by a sofer (professional religious scribe). It must have been written on the explicit instruction and free-willed approval of the husband, with the specific intention that it is to be used by the man and for the specific woman. It cannot be initially written with blanks to be filled in later.
 There are certain detailed requirements relating to the legal and religious nature of the  itself. For example:
 It must be written on a fresh document, and there must be no possibility of cleanly erasing the text.
 It may not be written on anything attached to the ground (for instance, a fig leaf).
 The  may not be pre-dated.

A  must be given of the free will of the husband; however, consent of the wife is not biblically mandated (nevertheless, Ashkenazic tradition provides that a husband may not divorce his wife without her consent). A  may not be given out of fear of any obligation either party undertook to fulfill in a separation agreement. Such an agreement may provide for matters such as custody of the children and their maintenance, and property settlement. But either party may withdraw from such an agreement, on the question of the dissolution of the marriage only, if they can satisfy the court of a genuine desire to restore matrimonial harmony. In such a situation all the recognised matrimonial obligations continue to apply. On the other hand, pecuniary conditions stipulated by the parties in the separation agreement would still be valid and enforceable, though the marriage state continues to exist.

Mesorevet get (Get refusal)

The laws of gittin only provide for a divorce initiated by the husband. However, the wife has the right to sue for divorce in a rabbinical court. The court, if finding just cause as prescribed in very rare cases in Jewish law, will require the husband to divorce his wife. In such cases, a husband who refused the court's demand that he divorce his wife would be subjected to various penalties in order to pressure him into granting a divorce. Such penalties included fines and corporal punishment; one such measure had the husband spend the night at an unmarked grave (with the implication that it could become his grave). In modern-day Israel, rabbinical courts have the power to sentence a husband to prison to compel him to grant his wife a get. Rabbinical courts outside of Israel do not have power to enforce such penalties. Prominent Jewish feminists have fought against such demands in recent decades.

Prominent Orthodox rabbis have pointed to many years of rabbinical sources that state that any coercion (kefiyah) can invalidate a get except in the most extreme of cases, and have spoken out against "get organizations", which they claim have often inflamed situations that could have otherwise been resolved amicably.

Sometimes a man will completely refuse to grant a divorce. This leaves his wife with no possibility of remarriage within Orthodox Judaism. Such a woman is called a mesorevet get (literally "refused a divorce"), if a court determined she is entitled to a divorce.

While it is widely assumed that the problem lies primarily in men refusing to grant a get to their wives, and that it is a widespread issue, in Israel, figures released from the Chief Rabbinate show that women equally refuse to accept a get and that the numbers are a couple of hundred on each side. While such a husband has the option of seeking a heter meah rabbanim, no similar option exists for the wife.

In Conservative Judaism a traditional get is required. However, in cases where the husband refuses to grant the get and the bet din (rabbinical court) has ruled that the husband's refusal is not justified, the marriage may be dissolved by hafqa'at kiddushin, or annulment of the marriage. This requires a majority vote of the Joint bet din, comprising nine rabbinic scholars. Upon their authorization of the process, the bet din may issue a certificate of annulment. This procedure is viewed as an extreme option and is only done in cases of dire necessity.

Agunah

Otherwise, the couple may be divorced under the civil law ("the law of the land") while still be considered to be married under Jewish law, with all the consequences which follow from that status. It is religiously forbidden for either spouse to remarry without a get. For the man, he is in violation of Orthodox Torah law, but it is worse for the woman, since doing so is considered adultery according to Jewish law, and children conceived in it mamzerim.

In history 

One of the most contentious gittin in history was probably the Get of Cleves of the late 18th century, which caused a rift between several rabbinic courts in Western Europe. The case involved a husband who at times exhibited signs of mental illness (in which paranoia was a contributing symptom) who gave his wife a get. As a get can only be given by a "sane" individual, much analysis and debate ensued regarding how to classify this individual as well as the precise definition of insanity in halakha.

In the Middle Ages, a woman could gain the status of a moredet (rebellious wife) and go to the Rabbinic courts to get a divorce. A woman could gain that status through a few means, including refusing to have sexual relations with her husband. However, sometimes doing so would mean she would forfeit her right to her ketubah.

In 2013, the New York divorce coercion gang, a group of rabbis that forced gittin through the use of kidnapping and torture, was closed down by the Federal Bureau of Investigation. A second one that utilized murder was closed in 2016.

In popular culture 

 Rochelle Majer Krich's book Till Death Do Us Part (1992), .
 In The Sopranos episode "Denial, Anger, Acceptance" (1999), Tony is hired for the purpose of convincing a stubborn Orthodox Jewish man to give a get to the man's wife.
 In the Coen Brothers film A Serious Man (2009) the demand for a get is a recurring plot device.
 The film Gett: The Trial of Viviane Amsalem (2014) shows the process of a Jewish woman trying to obtain a divorce from a reluctant husband.

See also 

 Agunah
 Beth din
 Jewish prenuptial agreement
 Jewish views on marriage
 Ketubah
 Lieberman clause (Conservative Judaism)

References

External links 

 Beth Din of America: Gittin (Jewish Divorce)
 Chabad.org: Jewish Divorce: Get
 Jewish Virtual Library: Divorce in Judaism
 JLaw.com: Jewish Divorce and the Role of Beit Din by Rabbi Jonathan Reiss

Divorce
Jewish marital law
Talmud concepts and terminology
Jewish life cycle
Positive Mitzvoth
Hebrew words and phrases in Jewish law
Divorce in Judaism